Kalidas Jayaram (born 16 December 1993) is an Indian actor who predominantly appears in Malayalam and Tamil films.

The son of film actors Jayaram and Parvathy, Kalidas made his debut in the Malayalam film Kochu Kochu Santhoshangal (2000) at the age of seven. Later, he starred in Ente Veedu Appuvinteyum (2003), which won him the National Film Award for Best Child Artist. In 2016, he made his debut in Tamil cinema with Meen Kuzhambum Mann Paanaiyum (2016) and returned to Malayalam with Poomaram (2018), written, co-produced and directed by Abrid Shine.

Early life 
Kalidas was born the eldest of two children, to actors Jayaram and Parvathy in  Perumbavoor, Kerala, India. He has a younger sister Malavika Jayaram. He had his primary education until tenth grade at Padma Seshadri Bala Bhavan, Chennai and his plus-two at Choice School, Cochin, Kerala. He received his bachelor's degree in Visual Communication from Loyola College, Chennai. Like his father, he is good at imitating actors, and the mimicry performed during a Vijay TV award show and an advertisement for a chocolate brand made him familiar to people.

Career

At the age of 7, he made his debut in Sathyan Anthikad's Kochu Kochu Santhoshangal (2000). He received the National Award for Best Child Artist for his second film Ente Veedu Appuvinteyum (2003), directed by Siby Malayil. Kalidas played the lead in Balaji Tharaneetharan's second directorial venture Oru Pakka Kathai. He made his debut as a lead actor in Malayalam cinema in Poomaram (2018). In 2019, Kalidas had 3 releases: Mr. & Ms. Rowdy, Argentina Fans Kaattoorkadavu and Happy Sardar.

Filmography

Web series

Discography

As a voice artist

Short films and Music Videos

Awards

References

External links

 
 

Living people
Male actors from Chennai
Kerala State Film Award winners
Male actors in Tamil cinema
Male actors in Malayalam cinema
Indian male film actors
21st-century Indian male actors
South Indian International Movie Awards winners
Best Child Artist National Film Award winners
1993 births